Zina Garrison and Lori McNeil were the defending champions but only McNeil competed that year with Betsy Nagelsen.

McNeil and Nagelsen lost in the final 6–4, 6–4 against Beth Herr and Candy Reynolds.

Seeds
Champion seeds are indicated in bold text while text in italics indicates the round in which those seeds were eliminated.

 Gigi Fernández /  Robin White (quarterfinals)
 Lori McNeil /  Betsy Nagelsen (final)
 Elise Burgin /  Rosalyn Fairbank (semifinals)
 Jenny Byrne /  Janine Tremelling (quarterfinals)

Draw

References
 1988 Virginia Slims of New Orleans Doubles Draw

Virginia Slims of New Orleans
1988 WTA Tour